Baird is an unincorporated community in Dunklin County, in the U.S. state of Missouri.

Baird was founded ca. 1910, taking its name from Martin V. Baird, the proprietor of a local sawmill.

References

Unincorporated communities in Dunklin County, Missouri
Unincorporated communities in Missouri